Thalia (minor planet designation: 23 Thalia) is a large main-belt asteroid. It was discovered by J. R. Hind on December 15, 1852, at the private observatory of W. Bishop, located in Hyde Park, London, England. Bishop named it after Thalia, the Muse of comedy and pastoral poetry in Greek mythology.

It is categorized as an S-type asteroid consisting of mainly of iron- and magnesium-silicates. This the second most common type of asteroid in the main belt.

With a semimajor axis of 2.628, the asteroid is orbiting between the 3:1 and 5:2 Kirkwood gaps in the main belt. Its orbital eccentricity is larger than the median value of 0.07 for the main belt, and the inclination is larger than the median of below 4°. But most of the main-belt asteroids have an eccentricity of no more than 0.4 and an inclination of up to 30°, so the orbit of 23 Thalia is not unusual for a main-belt asteroid.

Thalia has been studied by radar.

References

External links
 
 

Background asteroids
Thalia
Thalia
S-type asteroids (Tholen)
S-type asteroids (SMASS)
18521215